Gerald Thomas Flynn (October 7, 1910May 14, 1990) was a U.S. Representative from Wisconsin.

Born on a farm in Racine County, Wisconsin near Racine, Wisconsin, Flynn attended a rural grade school and St. Catherine's High School. 
He graduated from Marquette University Law School in 1933.
He was admitted to the bar in 1933 and commenced the practice of law in Racine, Wisconsin.
He served as delegate to Democratic National Conventions in 1940, 1944, 1948, 1952, 1956, and 1960.
He served as member of the Wisconsin State Senate from 1950 to 1954.

Flynn was elected as a Democrat to the Eighty-sixth Congress (January 3, 1959January 3, 1961). He represented Wisconsin's 1st congressional district.
He was an unsuccessful candidate for reelection in 1960 to the Eighty-seventh Congress and for election in 1962 to the Eighty-eighth Congress.
He resumed the practice of law.
He was a resident of Racine, Wisconsin, until his death there on May 14, 1990.

Notes

Sources

1910 births
1990 deaths
Politicians from Racine, Wisconsin
Democratic Party Wisconsin state senators
Marquette University Law School alumni
Wisconsin lawyers
Democratic Party members of the United States House of Representatives from Wisconsin
20th-century American lawyers
20th-century American politicians